Josh Hauge is an American ice hockey coach and former player who is currently in charge of the program at Union.

Career
Hauge played college hockey for Bethel around the turn of the century. He appeared in 76 games for the Royals over three seasons. After graduating in 2002, Hauge ended his playing career and turned to coaching, serving as the head coach for two teams in the Minnesota Junior Hockey League, a Tier III outfit. In 2005 he moved up to Tier II junior hockey as an assistant for the Fairbanks Ice Dogs. Three years later he was promoted to head coach and led his team on several deep playoff runs. After finishing as the runners-up in 2010, Hauge led the Ice Dogs to the championship in 2011.

With a league title in his back pocket, Hauge was again on the move, this time up to the Tier I level. He began the 2012 season as an assistant for the Tri-City Storm but, after a 6–15 start, he was installed as the interim head coach. The team finished with a winning record under Hauge and managed to make the postseason. The next year, now as the Storms' full-time coach, Hauge was unable to get a repeat performance out of his team and they finished with the worst record in their conference. While he was brought back for a third season, Tri-City started 4–9–2 and he was relieved of his duties.

Hauge remained in the USHL for another year as an assistant before making the jump to the college ranks. He joined Casey Jones' staff at Clarkson and help the program improve steadily over several seasons. In 2019, the Golden Knights won the ECAC tournament for the first time in 12 years and, partly as a result, Hauge was promoted to associate head coach. COVID-19 severely impacted the team over the next two seasons but Clarkson remained one of the top programs in their conference. In 2022, Union began a search for a head coach to replace the departed Rick Bennett, who had resigned under a cloud. The athletic department brought Hauge in as the program's 22nd head coach.

Head coaching record

Junior

† Mid-season replacement‡ Replaced mid-season

College

References

External links
 

1979 births
Living people
People from Apple Valley, Minnesota
Ice hockey people from Minnesota
Bethel University (Minnesota) alumni
Union Dutchmen ice hockey coaches